The San Salvador El Salvador Temple is the 135th temple of the Church of Jesus Christ of Latter-day Saints (LDS Church). It is the fourth temple to be built in Central America and the first in El Salvador.

History
Announced in 2007, construction began on the temple in September 2008. On 20 September, ground was broken and the site was dedicated by Don R. Clarke, of the Seventy and president of the church's Central America Area.
 
The temple is in Antiguo Cuscatlán, an affluent district southwest of San Salvador. The San Salvador volcano provides a background for the temple grounds and the three-story building.

A public open house was scheduled for 1–23 July 2011. The temple was dedicated on 21 August 2011, in three dedicatory sessions.

In 2020, the San Salvador El Salvador Temple was closed temporarily during the year in response to the coronavirus pandemic.

Gallery

See also

 Comparison of temples of The Church of Jesus Christ of Latter-day Saints
 List of temples of The Church of Jesus Christ of Latter-day Saints
 List of temples of The Church of Jesus Christ of Latter-day Saints by geographic region
 Temple architecture (Latter-day Saints)

References

External links
 
San Salvador El Salvador Temple Official site
San Salvador El Salvador Temple at ChurchofJesusChristTemples.org

21st-century Latter Day Saint temples
Buildings and structures in San Salvador
Religious buildings and structures in El Salvador
Religious buildings and structures completed in 2011
Temples (LDS Church) in Latin America
Temples (LDS Church) in North America
The Church of Jesus Christ of Latter-day Saints in El Salvador
2011 establishments in El Salvador